Hero Certified Burgers is a Canadian restaurant chain franchise that sells hamburgers and other quick service restaurant fare. It is based in Toronto, Ontario, Canada, and was founded in 2004. It had almost 60 locations as of March 2017, and opened its first store in the United States in 2015 in Elmwood Village, Buffalo, New York. The Buffalo location closed at the end of 2016. The company uses sustainably-sourced beef. The chain serves Cavendish Farms branded french fries from Prince Edward Island. The restaurant locations have Coca-Cola Freestyle machines on site.

The chain was founded in 2004 by John Lettieri, who opened the first store in Hazelton Lanes in Yorkville. Lettieri also owns the restaurant chain Lettieri café, based in Toronto. The company was the first Canadian franchise to focus on the provision of fast foods using food products from vendors that adhere to sustainable practices.

See also
 List of Canadian restaurant chains
 List of hamburger restaurants

References

Further reading

External links

 

Companies based in Toronto
Fast-food hamburger restaurants